The 1905 California Golden Bears football team was an American football team that represented the University of California, Berkeley during the 1905 college football season.	The team competed as an independent under head coach J. W. Knibbs and compiled a record of 4–1–2. This was Cal's last season of football until 1915, though rugby continued in this period.

Schedule

References

California
California Golden Bears football seasons
California Golden Bears football